The Association Trio (asotsirebuli trio; ; , asotsiiovane trio), also known as the Associated Trio, is a tripartite format for the enhanced cooperation, coordination, and dialogue between the Ministries of Foreign Affairs of Georgia, Moldova and Ukraine with the European Union on issues of common interest related to European integration, enhancing cooperation within the framework of the Eastern Partnership, and committing to the prospect of joining the European Union.

The participants of the format have expressed a clear position to obtain eventual membership in the European Union and reaffirm their commitment to further implement their respective Association Agreements with the EU. In this context, they recall that under Article 49 of the TEU, the countries of Georgia, Moldova, and Ukraine have a European perspective and can apply for membership in the European Union, provided that all the necessary criteria for EU membership are met.

Coordinating their actions, Georgia, Moldova and Ukraine seek to expand the possibilities of their Association Agreements, promote sectoral convergence with the EU (integration into the Digital Single Market, energy and customs union, ENTSO-E, and with the Schengen Area; transport cooperation, green course, justice and home affairs, strategic communications, health, security and defense) and gradually integrate into the European Single Market.

All three members of the Association Trio currently maintain free trade agreements with the EU through the Deep and Comprehensive Free Trade Area and are members of the Euronest Parliamentary Assembly.

In February–March 2022, in reaction to the 2022 Russian invasion of Ukraine, all three states submitted applications to join the EU within days of each other.

History 
A joint memorandum between the Foreign Ministers of Georgia, Moldova, and Ukraine (David Zalkaliani, Aureliu Ciocoi, and Dmytro Kuleba), initiated the creation of the format. It was signed on 17 May 2021, in Kyiv.

The Minister of Foreign Affairs of Ukraine, Dmytro Kuleba, stated that this initiative will help the three countries to move forward more effectively together through European integration:

According to him, the Associated Trio includes three main elements: structuring consultations on European integration between the three foreign ministries, engaging in dialogue with European institutions and EU members, and coordinating the positions of countries within the Eastern Partnership.

In turn, the Minister of Foreign Affairs of Georgia, David Zalkaliani, said that Ukraine, Georgia and Moldova have a common goal of future EU membership and would like to restore unity with European countries:

While the Minister of Foreign Affairs and European Integration of the Republic of Moldova, Aureliu Ciocoi, said that by signing the memorandum the three countries reaffirmed their European intentions, great interest in the ambitious goals of the Eastern Partnership and are ready to contribute.

On 18 May 2021, in Brussels, the representative of the EU diplomatic service, Peter Stano, stated that the European Union respects and shares the commitment to the European integration of Ukraine, Georgia and Moldova, which created the so-called "Associated Trio":

Members 

Members of the Eastern Partnership belonging to the Association Trio:
 Georgia
 Moldova
 Ukraine

Other members of the Eastern Partnership not belonging to the Association Trio:
 Armenia
 Azerbaijan
 Belarus (Belarus announced a suspension of its participation in the Eastern Partnership on 28 June 2021)

Mechanisms of cooperation 
In accordance with the common interests of their European integration, the participants will cooperate to enhance their political association and economic integration with the EU, as stipulated by the three respective Association Agreements, and promote new opportunities within the Eastern Partnership. The participants believe that the significant potential of further development of their states’ integration with the EU requires that the tools and areas of cooperation correspond to the needs and capabilities of the "Association Trio", providing them with more opportunities of enhanced political dialogue, as well as, greater economic integration.

The participants are confident that the process of their European integration will further benefit from the incentive-based approach ("more for more") aimed to set progressive benchmarks of the integration process and provide for tangible achievements for their societies. The participants’ contribution to the cooperation within the Eastern Partnership will be without prejudice to their bilateral cooperation with the EU, in line with their European aspirations. The participants underline the importance of EU support to the partners’ sovereignty and territorial integrity within their internationally recognized borders, as well as, to strengthening their resilience and countering security challenges. The participants will continue working towards strengthening the EU’s role in advancing peaceful resolution of conflicts within relevant formats and platforms.

Taking into account ambitious and complex European-oriented reform agenda of the "Association Trio", the participants recognize the crucial role of EU assistance, in particular through dedicated financial instruments, corresponding to the level of their commitments and goals and in line with the principle of conditionality in relation to the progress in reforms.

Initiatives 
Guided by the goal of deepening their European integration process, as well as, willing to ensure further strategic development of the Eastern Partnership, the participants agreed to promote joint dialogues with EU institutions and EU members states, in the following areas:

 Expanding the agenda of the dialogues between the European Commission and the "Association Trio", in addition to the DCFTA related issues, to new thematic areas for enhanced cooperation, such as transport, energy, digital transformation, green economy, justice and home affairs, strategic communications, healthcare;
 Looking beyond the DCFTA framework and allocating additional tools to facilitate the integration of the "Association Trio" into the EU Internal Market;
 Enhancing security and defense cooperation with the EU with special focus on countering hybrid threats, strengthening cyber resilience, developing cooperation platforms with the EU Hybrid Fusion Cell and EU Cyber Security Agency, participation in CSDP missions and operations, as well as, participation in the EU Permanent Structured Cooperation (PESCO) projects;   
 Promoting further engagement of the "Association Trio" in the EU framework programs and agencies;
 Supporting mobilization of the EU robust assistance to uphold complex reforms by the "Association Trio" and ensuring their access to alternative funds and resources at the EU’s disposal, including for implementation of the projects of common interest;
 Coordinating joint efforts within the Eastern Partnership, based on European aspirations and common needs of the Association Trio.

Methods of cooperation 
As per the present memorandum, the participants agree to strengthen their cooperation by the following means:

 Conducting regular and/or ad-hoc trilateral consultations to review ongoing developments or discuss specific issues in the framework of their integration with the EU;   
 Establishing "Association Trio" coordinators within the respective Ministries of Foreign Affairs;
 Holding "Association Trio" coordination meetings on expert, senior official, and ministerial levels ahead of important events of the Eastern Partnership;
 Undertaking joint diplomatic demarches to the EU institutions and the EU member states on jointly agreed issues related to their European aspirations, common initiatives of their European integration, as well as, cooperation within the Eastern Partnership;  
 Conducting coordinated public communication on the common approaches related to the European aspirations of the "Association Trio", including expert events and publications; 
 Developing new dialogue platforms with regional initiatives involving EU member states, aimed at mobilization of support to the Trio’s European aspirations.

Memorandum 
Memorandum of Understanding between the Ministry of Foreign Affairs of Georgia, the Ministry of Foreign Affairs and European Integration of the Republic of Moldova and the Ministry of Foreign Affairs of Ukraine

On Establishing Enhanced Cooperation on European Integration – the “Association Trio”

The Ministries of Foreign Affairs of Georgia, the Republic of Moldova and Ukraine (hereinafter the «Participants»):

Taking into account the European choice, European aspirations and European identity of their nations,

Welcoming each other’s intentions to achieve membership in the European Union,

Adhering fully to the values on which the European Union is founded,

Taking into account close historical relationship and progressively closer links between the European Union, its Member States and their countries, as well as their desire to strengthen and widen relations in an ambitious and innovative way,

Underlining the sovereign right of our nations to determine their own future,

Having established political association and economic integration with the EU through the Association Agreements,

Recognizing strategic importance of the Eastern Partnership and remaining committed to its further development,

Have come to the following understanding:

...

Trio + 1 

In December 2019, following the eighth plenary meeting of the Euronest Parliamentary Assembly, a resolution was passed by all members outlining various EU integration goals to be achieved by 2030. The resolution highlights the importance of the Eastern Partnership program and how the initiative supports the six EU associated countries in letting them move more rapidly with reform implementation and deeper political and economic integration with the EU. The resolution coined the term "Trio + 1" which represents the three Association Agreements established with Georgia, Moldova and Ukraine, as well as, the CEPA established with Armenia. The resolution calls for promoting further integration efforts between the EU and the "Trio + 1" group over the next decade.

EU membership perspective 

, Georgia and Ukraine were preparing to formally apply for EU membership in 2024 to join the European Union in the 2030s. However, the 2022 Russian Invasion of Ukraine sped up this timetable and led Ukraine, Georgia, and Moldova to all apply for membership in February–March 2022.

The European Parliament noted that in accordance with Article 49 of the Treaty on European Union, Georgia, Moldova and Ukraine, like any other European country, have a European perspective and can apply for EU membership in accordance with the principles of democracy.

See also 

 Community for Democracy and Rights of Nations
 Community of Democratic Choice
 Euronest Parliamentary Assembly
 European Neighbourhood Policy
 EU Strategy for the South Caucasus
 Future enlargement of the European Union
 GUAM Organization for Democracy and Economic Development
 Lublin Triangle
 Politics of Europe
 Three Seas Initiative

References

External links 
 Memorandum of Understanding between the Ministry of Foreign Affairs of Georgia, the Ministry of Foreign Affairs and European Integration of the Republic of Moldova and the Ministry of Foreign Affairs of Ukraine

21st-century treaties
Foreign relations of Georgia (country)
Foreign relations of Moldova
Foreign relations of Ukraine
European integration
2021 establishments in Europe
2021 treaties